Sergei Diyachuk (born 4 September 1980) is a Ukrainian skier. He competed in the Nordic combined event at the 2006 Winter Olympics.

References

External links
 

1980 births
Living people
Ukrainian male Nordic combined skiers
Olympic Nordic combined skiers of Ukraine
Nordic combined skiers at the 2006 Winter Olympics
People from Kremenets
Sportspeople from Ternopil Oblast